The 2000 Women's World Snooker Championship was a women's snooker tournament. It was the 2000 edition of the World Women's Snooker Championship, first held in 1976.

The tournament was won by Kelly Fisher, who retained the title by defeating Lisa Ingall 4–1 in the final. This was the third year in succession that Fisher won the title. The rounds before the semi-final were played at the Radion Executive Club, Sheffield, and the semi-finals and final were played at the Crucible Theatre.

Main Draw

References 

2000 in English sport
2000 in snooker
2000 in women's sport
International sports competitions hosted by England
2000